Ukah is a surname. Notable people with the surname include:

Chinonso Ukah (born 1996), Nigerian comedienne, influencer, and actress
Ugo Ukah (born 1984), Nigerian footballer
Warren Ukah (born 1985), American soccer player
Ostenaco ( 1703–1780), also called Ukah, a Cherokee chief

Surnames of African origin